May God Save Us is a 2016 Spanish crime thriller film directed by Rodrigo Sorogoyen and written by Sorogoyen and Isabel Peña. It stars Antonio de la Torre and Roberto Álamo as a couple of flawed police investigators tracking down a serial killer of elderly women in Madrid.

Plot 
In the hot summer of 2011, against the backdrop of the economic crisis and the 15-M Movement, Madrid is swarmed by a million and a half of pilgrims awaiting the visit of Pope Benedict XVI. Two police inspectors are commissioned to investigate a brutal serial killer who rapes and kills older women. The two inspectors will have to solve the case in a short time and without too much clamor. The ending is unexpected and after three years from the facts told.

Cast

Production 
The screenplay of May God Save Us was penned by Isabel Peña and Rodrigo Sorogoyen. The film was produced by Tornasol Films, Atresmedia Cine, Mistery Producciones AIE and Hernández y Fernández PC, with the participation of Atresmedia, Movistar+ and Telemadrid. Outdoor scenes in Malasaña involved shooting in the Maestro Guerrero and Desengaño streets. In addition to Madrid, footage was also shot in Tenerife, taking advantage of the Canarian archipelago's tax incentives. The film was edited by Alberto del Campo and Fernando Franco.

Release 
The film had its world premiere in September 2016 at the 64th San Sebastián International Film Festival, screened in the festival's main competition. Distributed by Warner Bros, the film was theatrically released in Spain on 28 October 2016.

Reception 
Jonathan Holland of The Hollywood Reporter wrote that Sorogoyen "mixes up police procedural, social crit, character study, black humor and Catholicism into a taut and distinctive whole",  summing up as a bottom line: "sweaty and suspenseful".

Carlos Marañón of Cinemanía rated the film 4 out of 5 stars, deeming it to be a benchmark noir for Madrid's Augusts, supported by a dedicated and well-understood costumbrismo, and channeling Spain's recent past.

Quim Casas of El Periódico de Catalunya also gave it 4 out of 5 stars, considering the Sorogoyen shoots well the oppression of the moment and the atmosphere, with the film, up until certain point, "confronting and unscrewing the two protagonists, both of whom are plunged into their own hells".

Javier Ocaña of El País wrote that the film features a "a superb work of art direction and mise-en-scène with a vehement and very attractive camera", offering a socially disheartening portrait of Madrid, assessing that the film may only raise doubts in regard of the "excessive psychological explanations". He also wrote about the cast's "fabulous" performances, from Álamo and De la Torre to those actors barely declaiming a few lines.

Accolades 

|-
| align = "center" rowspan = "17" | 2017 || rowspan = "2" | 22nd Forqué Awards || colspan = "2" | Best Film ||  || rowspan = "2" | 
|-
| Best Actor || Roberto Álamo || 
|-
| rowspan = "7" | 4th Feroz Awards || colspan = "2" | Best Drama Film ||  || rowspan = "7" | 
|-
| Best Director || Rodrigo Sorogoyen || 
|-
| Best Screenplay || Isabel Peña, Rodrigo Sorogoyen || 
|-
| Best Actor (film) || Roberto Álamo || 
|-
| Best Supporting Actor (film) || Javier Pereira || 
|-
| Best Original Score || || 
|-
| Best Trailer || || 
|-
| rowspan = "6" | 31st Goya Awards || colspan = "2" | Best Film ||  || rowspan = "6"  | 
|-
| Best Director || Rodrigo Sorogoyen || 
|-
| Best Actor || Roberto Álamo || 
|-
| Best Supporting Actor || Javier Pereira || 
|-
| Best Original Screenplay || || 
|-
| Best Editing || || 
|-
| 26th Actors and Actresses Union Awards || Best Film Actor in a Secondary Role || Javier Pereira ||  || 
|-
| 4th Platino Awards || Best Editing || ||  || 
|-
|}

See also 
 List of Spanish films of 2016

References

External links 

2016 thriller films
Spanish crime thriller films
2010s Spanish-language films
Films set in Madrid
2010s serial killer films
Films set in 2011
Tornasol Films films
Atresmedia Cine films
Films shot in Madrid
Films shot in the Canary Islands
2010s Spanish films
Spanish neo-noir films